The Mal'ta–Buret' culture is an archaeological culture of  24,000 to 15,000 BP in the Upper Paleolithic on the upper Angara River in the area west of Lake Baikal in the Irkutsk Oblast, Siberia, Russian Federation. The type sites are named for the villages of Mal'ta, Usolsky District and Buret' , Bokhansky District (both in Irkutsk Oblast).

A boy whose remains were found near Mal'ta is usually known by the abbreviation MA-1 (or MA1). Discovered in the 1920s, the remains have been dated to 24,000 BP. According to research published since 2013, MA-1 belonged to a population related to the genetic ancestors of Siberians, American Indians, and Bronze Age Yamnaya and Botai people of the Eurasian steppe. In particular, modern-day Native Americans, Kets, Mansi, and Selkup have been found to harbour a significant amount of ancestry related to MA-1.

Much of what is known about Mal'ta comes from the Russian archaeologist Mikhail Gerasimov. Better known later for his contribution to the branch of anthropology known as forensic facial reconstruction, Gerasimov made revolutionary discoveries when he excavated Mal'ta in 1927. Until his findings, the Upper Paleolithic societies of Northern Asia were virtually unknown. Over the remainder of his career, Gerasimov twice more visited Mal'ta to excavate and research the site.

Material culture

Habitation and tools

Mal'ta consists of semi-subterranean houses that were built using large animal bones to assemble the walls, and reindeer antlers covered with animal skins to construct a roof that would protect the inhabitants from the harsh elements of the Siberian weather.

Evidence seems to indicate that Mal'ta is the most ancient known site in eastern Siberia, with the nearby site of Buret'. However, relative dating illustrates some irregularities. The use of flint flaking and the absence of pressure flaking used in the manufacture of tools, as well as the continued use of earlier forms of tools, seem to confirm the fact that the site belongs to the early Upper Paleolithic. Yet it lacks typical skreblos (large side scrapers) that are common in other Siberian Paleolithic sites. Additionally, other common characteristics such as pebble cores, wedge-shaped cores, burins, and composite tools have never been found. The lack of these features, combined with an art style found in only one other nearby site (the Venus of Buret'), make Mal'ta culture unique in Siberia.

Art
There were two main types of art during the Upper Paleolithic: mural art, which was concentrated in Western Europe, and portable art. Portable art, typically some type of carving in ivory tusk or antler, spans the distance across Western Europe into Northern and Central Asia. Artistic remains of expertly carved bone, ivory, and antler objects depicting birds and human females are the most commonly found; these objects are, collectively, the primary source of Mal'ta's acclaim.

In addition to the female statuettes there are bird sculptures depicting swans, geese, and ducks. Through ethnographic analogy comparing the ivory objects and burials at Mal'ta with objects used by 19th and 20th-century Siberian shamans, it has been suggested that they are evidence of a fully developed shamanism.

Also, there are engraved representations on slabs of mammoth tusk. One is the figure of a mammoth, easily recognizable by the trunk, tusks, and thick legs. Wool also seems to be etched, by the placement of straight lines along the body. Another drawing depicts three snakes with their heads puffed up and turned to the side. It is believed that they were similar to cobras.

Venus figurines

Perhaps the best example of Paleolithic portable art is something referred to as "Venus figurines". Until they were discovered in Mal'ta, "Venus figurines" were previously found only in Europe. Carved from the ivory tusk of a mammoth, these images were typically highly stylized, and often involved embellished and disproportionate characteristics (typically the breasts or buttocks). It is widely believed that these emphasized features were meant to be symbols of fertility. Around thirty female statuettes of varying shapes have been found in Mal'ta. The wide variety of forms, combined with the realism of the sculptures and the lack of repetitiveness in detail, are definite signs of developed, albeit early, art.

At first glance, what is obvious is that the Mal'ta Venus figurines are of two types: full-figured women with exaggerated forms, and women with a thin, delicate form. Some of the figures are nude, while others have etchings that seem to indicate fur or clothing. Conversely, unlike those found in Europe, some of the Venus figurines from Mal'ta were sculpted with faces. Most of the figurines were tapered at the bottom, and it is believed that this was done to enable them to be stuck into the ground or otherwise placed upright. Placed upright, they could have symbolized the spirits of the dead, akin to "spirit dolls" used nearly worldwide, including in Siberia, among contemporary people.

Context of the Venus figurines
The Mal'ta figurines garner interest in the western world because they seem to be of the same basic form as European female figurines of roughly the same time period, suggestion some cultural and cultic connection. This similarity between Mal'ta and Upper Paleolithic Europe coincides with other suggested similarities between the two, such as in their tools and dwelling structures.

On the other hand, one can argue that, as a group, the Mal'ta Venus figurines are rather different from the female figurines of Western and Central Europe. For example, none of the Siberian specimens depict abdominal enlargement as many European examples do. Also, as breasts are often lacking in the Mal'ta figurines, few offer clear enough evidence of sex to define them as female. More conclusively, nearly half of them show some facial details, something which is lacking in the Venus figurines of Europe. It may not be possible to reach a definitive answer as to the origins of these peoples and their culture.

A 2016 genomic study shows that the Mal'ta people have no genetic connections to the Dolní Věstonice people from the Gravettian culture.

Symbolism

Discussing this easternmost outpost of paleolithic culture, Joseph Campbell finishes by commenting on the symbolic forms of the artifacts found there:

Archaeogenetics

MA-1 is the only known example of basal Y-DNA R* (R-M207*) – that is, the only member of haplogroup R* that did not belong to haplogroups R1, R2 or secondary subclades of these. The mitochondrial DNA of MA-1 belonged to an unresolved subclade of haplogroup U.

The term Ancient North Eurasian (ANE) has been  given in genetic literature to an ancestral component that represents descent from the people similar to the Mal'ta–Buret' culture or a population closely related to them.

A people similar to MA1 and Afontova Gora were important genetic contributors to Native Americans, Siberians, Northeastern Europeans, Caucasians, Central Asians, with smaller contributions to Middle Easterners and some East Asians. Lazaridis et al. (2016) notes "a cline of ANE ancestry across the east-west extent of Eurasia."

MA1 is also related to two older Upper Paleolithic Siberian individuals found at the Yana Rhinoceros Horn Site called Ancient North Siberians (ANS).

References

Bibliography
 
 
 

 
 
 Martynov, Anatoly I, The Ancient Art of Northern Asia, trans. Demitri B. Shimkin and Edith M. Shimkin. Chicago, Illinois: University of Illinois Press, 1991.

External links

 "Faces of our Ancestors: A centenary celebration of M. M. Gerasimov." Кунсткамера - Новости
 Ancient Siberian’s skeleton yields links to Europe and Native Americans peene

Upper Paleolithic cultures
Archaeological sites in Siberia
Archaeological cultures of Siberia
Irkutsk Oblast
Cultural heritage monuments in Irkutsk Oblast
Culture of Irkutsk Oblast